Justin Pickering is a former Australian rules footballer notable for playing for  in the Australian Football League (AFL).

Playing career
He followed this up with 18 games during the 1989 season. The following two seasons he played a total of 18 matches to have a total 59 senior matches at the end of the 1991 AFL season.

References

External links
 
 

1967 births
Richmond Football Club players
Living people
Australian rules footballers from Victoria (Australia)